August Mikael Soininen (3 November 1860 – 12 March 1924; surname until 1906 Johnsson) was a Finnish professor of Education theory (at the University of Helsinki) and politician, born in Kuhmoniemi. He was Minister of Education from 27 November 1918 to 15 March 1920 and a member of the Parliament of Finland, representing the Finnish Party from 1907 to 1911 and the National Progressive Party from 1919 to 1922.

References

1860 births
1924 deaths
People from Kuhmo
People from Oulu Province (Grand Duchy of Finland)
Finnish Lutherans
Finnish Party politicians
National Progressive Party (Finland) politicians
Ministers of Education of Finland
Members of the Parliament of Finland (1907–08)
Members of the Parliament of Finland (1908–09)
Members of the Parliament of Finland (1909–10)
Members of the Parliament of Finland (1910–11)
Members of the Parliament of Finland (1919–22)
University of Helsinki alumni
Academic staff of the University of Helsinki